Caenognosis is a genus of moths belonging to the family Tortricidae.

Species
Caenognosis incisa Walsingham in Andrews, 1900

References

 , in Andrews 1900, Monogr. Christmas Island 79.
 , 2005, World catalogue of insects volume 5 Tortricidae

External links
tortricidae.com

Chlidanotini
Tortricidae genera
Taxa named by Thomas de Grey, 6th Baron Walsingham